Amandinea is a genus of lichenized fungi in the family Caliciaceae. Genetic studies indicates that the genus Amandinea and Buellia are the same, although this is not widely accepted.

Taxonomy
The genus was originally circumscribed by Maurice Choisy in 1950, with Amandinea coniops assigned as the type species. However, the name was published invalidly because it was not accompanied by a Latin description or diagnosis, a requirement of the nomenclatural rules of the time. Christoph Scheidegger and Helmut Mayrhofer published the genus name validly in 1993.
The generic name honours French Madame Amandine Manière, an acquaintance of Choisy.

Species
, Species Fungorum accepts 88 species of Amandinea:
 Amandinea analgifera 
 Amandinea antipodensis 
 Amandinea augusta 
 Amandinea australasica 
 Amandinea austroconiops 
 Amandinea babingtonii 
 Amandinea bittangabeensis 
 Amandinea brugierae 
 Amandinea brunneola 
 Amandinea cacuminum 
 Amandinea clearyi 
 Amandinea conglomerata 
 Amandinea coniops 
 Amandinea conranensis 
 Amandinea crassiuscula 
 Amandinea decedens 
 Amandinea decedens 
 Amandinea deminuta 
 Amandinea destituta 
 Amandinea devilliersiana 
 Amandinea diorista 
 Amandinea discreta 
 Amandinea dudleyensis 
 Amandinea efflorescens 
 Amandinea endochroa 
 Amandinea errata 
 Amandinea extenuata 
 Amandinea falklandica 
 Amandinea feraxioides 
 Amandinea fouquieriensis 
 Amandinea fuscoatratula 
 Amandinea hnatiukii 
 Amandinea hypohyalina 
 Amandinea hypopallida 
 Amandinea hypostictica 
 Amandinea incrustans 
 Amandinea isabellina 
 Amandinea julianeae 
 Amandinea langloisii 
 Amandinea latemarginata 
 Amandinea lecideina 
 Amandinea lignicola 
 Amandinea litoralis 
 Amandinea lobarica 
 Amandinea madeirensis  – Portugal
 Amandinea maritima 
 Amandinea mediospora 
 Amandinea megaspora 
 Amandinea melaxanthella 
 Amandinea microsticta 
 Amandinea montana 
 Amandinea mountmeensis 
 Amandinea myrticola 
 Amandinea nana 
 Amandinea natalensis 
 Amandinea nebulosa 
 Amandinea neoconglomerata 
 Amandinea nitrophila 
 Amandinea occidentalis 
 Amandinea okainensis 
 Amandinea oleicola 
 Amandinea ornata 
 Amandinea otagensis 
 Amandinea pelidna 
 Amandinea petermannii 
 Amandinea pillagaensis 
 Amandinea polyxanthonica 
 Amandinea porulosa 
 Amandinea prospersa 
 Amandinea prothallinata 
 Amandinea pseudomultispora 
 Amandinea puertomonttensis 
 Amandinea punctata 
 Amandinea rangitatensis 
 Amandinea ropinii 
 Amandinea skottsbergii 
 Amandinea stajsicii 
 Amandinea subbadioatra 
 Amandinea subcervina 
 Amandinea subduplicata 
 Amandinea submontana 
 Amandinea subplicata 
 Amandinea trassii 
 Amandinea tristiuscula 
 Amandinea turgescens 
 Amandinea variabilis 
 Amandinea vitellina 
 Amandinea windmillensis 
 Amandinea xylographella

Gallery

References

 
Lichen genera
Caliciales genera
Taxa described in 1950
Taxa named by Maurice Choisy